One Year Off is an upcoming British comedy film written by Kate Wood and Stewart Thompson and is directed by Philippe Martinez. The film stars Jeff Fahey, Nathalie Cox, Chad Michael Collins, Ray Fearon, Evgeniya Ahkremenko and Niki Spiridakos.

Cast
The cast include:
 Jeff Fahey
 Nathalie Cox
 Chad Michael Collins
 Ray Fearon
 Evgeniya Ahkremenko
 Niki Spiridakos
 Genevieve Capovilla
 Lucas Livesey
 Antonio Fargas

Production
Principal photography began on February 25, 2021, and concluded on March 25, 2021 in Saint Kitts and Nevis.

References

External links
 

Upcoming films
British comedy films